Pineville Historic District is a national historic district located at Pineville, Berkeley County, South Carolina. It encompasses seven contributing buildings and illustrates Pineville's original role as a 19th-century pineland village, and its gradual transformation to agricultural land and to a year-round community in the late-19th and early-20th centuries. The Pineville Historic District consists of four principal buildings, three residential buildings and one Episcopal church, ranging in date from about 1810 through 1925. The architectural styles represented include Federal, Greek Revival, and Bungalow.  In the mid to late-19th century, Pineville was a densely settled village that included as many as one hundred buildings, including an academy, racetrack, library, churches, and residences. Much of the town was burned by Union troops at the close of the American Civil War in April 1865. In the years following the war, much of the land that made up the village was converted for use as farmland. Since that time, Pineville has remained a small community of less than 20 structures surrounded by open farm and hunting lands.

It was listed in the National Register of Historic Places in 1992.

References

External links
 

Historic American Buildings Survey in South Carolina
Historic districts on the National Register of Historic Places in South Carolina
Federal architecture in South Carolina
Greek Revival architecture in South Carolina
Buildings and structures in Berkeley County, South Carolina
National Register of Historic Places in Berkeley County, South Carolina